Mind Quiz, also known as Mind Quiz: Exercise Your Brain or Mind Quiz: Your Brain Coach (Nounenrei: Nou Stress Kei Atama Scan in Japan), is a mental training game for the Nintendo DS and PlayStation Portable. It is similar to Nintendo's Brain Age: Train Your Brain in Minutes a Day! It involves playing different training exercises to measure and improve particular parts of the player's brain, such as one's brain age and its brain stress degree.

Overview 
The game offers over 40 training games, each being separated into 4 brain training categories:

Calculation — Tests the player's ability to apply mathematics skills.
Reflex — Displays problems that mostly require the player to rapidly press buttons.
Judgment — Examines how well the player can apply decision-making and thinking skills.
Memory — Tests the player's ability to memorize certain numbers, shapes, and the like.

Grading system 
Grades in Mind Quiz range from A+ to E, each being associated with a different level of performance.

Game modes 
Game modes include
 Datafile: measures performance in each of the five areas
 Save/Delete: allows the player to save or delete his data
 Brain Age Test: tests brain age with four mini-examinations
 Training
 Challenge

Exams 
Take any one of five different exams in all four Mind Quiz fields.

Galleries 
View two different galleries: one containing animal pictures, and one containing Brain Trainer Awards.

Network 
Accessible from the Main Menu, this function requires two PSP systems with the Mind Quiz: Exercise Your Brain UMD inside, and with the WLAN switch on. One player selects "Player Search" and is the host. The other player selects "Participate" and is the recipient. Once a connection is established, the players prepare and start competing. Each player is given a set number of questions. Whoever gets all questions first wins.

Gameplay 
After entering the Training Mode, the player is asked his first question. When the game is finished, a report card will show time, rate %, and letter grade, along with a comment from the teacher.

UK Recall 
On June 29, 2007, Ubisoft, the game's publisher, voluntarily pulled the game from store shelves in the UK upon complaints that the word spastic, a term referring to a disability which is offensive in the UK, was triggered when the player incorrectly answered certain questions. Ubisoft stated "As soon as we were made aware of the issue we stopped distribution of the product and are now working with retailers to pull the game off the market."

The only country where the European English version of the game is sold is Australia since the term is not considered especially offensive there.

The same incident occurred with the game Mario Party 8, released for the Nintendo Wii, just a month later. The same word caused controversy and was recalled in the UK. However, unlike Mind Quiz, that word was replaced by the word "erratic" and it was finally re-released in the UK on August 3, 2007.

Reception 

The title received mixed reviews; garnering 51.20% on GameRankings. GameSpot gave the game 4.9/10 (Poor), stating that "Mind Quiz: Your Brain Coach is a shameless clone of Nintendo's brain-training DS game, Brain Age" and that "This game isn't good enough to serve as a game for Brain Age players who are looking for more of the same because it's too similar yet too shallow to entertain that crowd. If you fall into the group of people who haven't played Brain Age, you should go with that one rather than waste your time on a pretender like Mind Quiz." However, the game averaged 75.3 on Quiz Expo.

See also 
 Brain
 Brain coaching
 Bell curve

References

External links 
Mind Quiz: Your Brain Coach Nintendo Website
Mind Quiz: Your Brain Coach Ubisoft Website
BBC News article on the Controversy

2006 video games
Brain training video games
Nintendo DS games
PlayStation Portable games
Sega video games
Ubisoft games
Video games developed in Japan